Antepirrhoe atrifasciata is a species of geometrid moth in the family Geometridae.

The MONA or Hodges number for Antepirrhoe atrifasciata is 7212.

References

Further reading

 
 

Cidariini
Articles created by Qbugbot
Moths described in 1888